Matadakurubarahatti  is a census town in Chitradurga district in the south Indian state of Karnataka.

Demographics
As of 2001 India census, Matadakurubarahatti had a population of 5176 with 2905 males and 2271 females.

See also
 Chitradurga
 Districts of Karnataka

References

External links
 http://Chitradurga.nic.in/

Villages in Chitradurga district